Is This a Zombie? is an anime series adapted from the light novels of the same title written by Shinichi Kimura and illustrated by Kobuichi and Muririn. The series follows the adventures of Ayumu Aikawa, a zombie who is resurrected by a necromancer named Eucliwood Hellscythe after being killed by a serial killer. As he tries to make the best of his undead life, he encounters a Masō-Shōjo named Haruna and inadvertently takes her magic powers, being forced to become a Masō-Shōjo in the process. With Eucliwood, Haruna, and a vampire ninja named Seraphim living with him, Ayumu helps battle demons known as Megalos while trying to figure out the mystery behind his own death.

Produced by Studio Deen and directed by Takaomi Kanasaki, the series was broadcast on TV Saitama, Chiba TV, and Sun Television from January 10 to April 4, 2011, with later broadcasts on Gifu Broadcasting System, Inc., Kyoto Broadcasting System, Mie TV, Tokyo MX, TV Kanagawa, TVQ Kyushu Broadcasting, Nico Nico Channel, and AT-X. The last three episodes were pushed back a week due to the 2011 Tōhoku earthquake and tsunami. The series was also simulcast by Crunchyroll on their streaming site. An OVA 13th episode was released on DVD with the eighth light novel on June 10, 2011. Six DVD and Blu-ray volumes were released by Kadokawa Pictures between March 25 and August 26, 2011. The anime is licensed in North America by Funimation, who released the series in 2012.

The second season, titled , aired on April 5, 2012 on Tokyo MX, with subsequent broadcast runs on TVQ, Sun TV, Gifu Broadcasting System, Inc., Mie TV, BS11, Chiba TV, TV Kanagawa, TV Saitama and AT-X. An "episode 0" OVA was released with the tenth light novel volume on DVD on April 25, 2012, while the eleventh episode of the series was released with the sixth manga volume on October 20, 2012 on Blu-ray. This brings the total number of animated episodes to twenty-five. The English adaptation of the second season was released by Funimation on September 24, 2013. American television network Chiller began airing the show on its Anime Wednesdays block on July 15, 2015.

Four pieces of theme music are used for the series: two opening themes and two ending themes.


Episode list

Is This a Zombie? (2011)

Is This a Zombie? of the Dead (2012)

References

External links
 
 Is this a Zombie? - The Official Anime Website from FUNimation

Is This a Zombie